Louise Maria Hansson (born 24 November 1996) is a Swedish competitive swimmer, a member of Helsingborgs SS.

Career

International Swimming League 
In spring 2020 Hansson signed for the Toronto Titans, the first Canadian based team in the ISL. This will be the first time Louise Hansson has swum in the ISL.

World Championships 
2021: Hansson will represent Sweden at the rescheduled 2021 Tokyo Olympics, after qualifying for the 2020 Olympic Games.

2019: Hansson achieved 7th place in 100m fly; 6th in the 4x100m fr; and 7th in the 4x100m medley relay at the World Aquatic Championships in Gwangju, South Korea.

2017: At the 2017 World Aquatic Championships in Budapest, Hansson reached 5th place in the 4x100m free and missed the 100m fly semi by 0.2 seconds.

2016: Hansson did also participate in the 2016 Olympic Games in Rio de Janeiro. She swam 100 fly, 200 IM individually and all relays. In both 4x100 freestyle and 4x200 freestyle Sweden finished 5th.

2015: Hansson was anchoring in the relay that won a silver at the 2015 FINA World Swimming Championship in Kazan, Russia.

2013: At the 2013 World Aquatics Championships, she finished fourth in the 4 × 100 metre freestyle relay. At the 2014 World Championships (25m) in Doha, Qatar she was a part of the relay team that finished fourth in the 4 × 100 metre medley relay.

2012: Individually, at the 2012 FINA World Swimming Championships (25 m), she finished 8th in the final of the Women's 100 metre freestyle, 9th in the 50 metre butterfly, missing out on the final with one hundredth of a second, and 9th as well in the 100 metre butterfly.

Other 
2018: Hansson reached the finals in the 100m fly in the 2018 European Aquatics Championships in Glasgow.

2016: Hansson was bronze in the 4 x 100m fr relay at the 2016 European Aquatics Championships. She also moved to Los Angeles to swim for the University of Southern California in this year.

2015: Hansson won her first international medal in an individual event, a bronze in the 200m individual medley, at the 2015 Short Course Championships in Netanya, Israel. In the 4×50m medley relay she won a silver medal swimming the backstroke lead-off leg. Her sister Sophie swam the second (breaststroke) leg.

2014: She won a gold medal at the 2014 European Aquatics Championships in Berlin with her team in the 4 × 100 m freestyle, and silver medals in the 4 × 200 m freestyle, in a new Swedish record.

She finished 9th in the 200 metre freestyle and tenth in the 200 metre individual medley and in the 100 metre butterfly at the 2014 European Aquatics Championships.

2012: At the 2012 European Aquatics Championships, she finished 9th in the 50 metre butterfly. At the 2012 European Aquatics Championships, she won a silver medal as part of the Swedish 4 × 100 m freestyle team.

2011: At the 2011 European Junior Swimming Championships, she won gold in the 50 m butterfly and a silver medal in the 50m freestyle. At the 2012 European Junior Swimming Championships, she again won gold in the 50m butterfly.

Personal records
The personal bests of Louise Hansson, as of 1 July 2019.

NJR

NJR

NJR
NJR

Personal
She lives in Ramlösa, Helsingborg, Sweden. Her younger sister Sophie Hansson is also a competitive swimmer, winner of a bronze medal at the 2014 European Junior Swimming Championships and finishing fourth in the 50 metre breaststroke at the 2014 Summer Youth Olympics. Her father Lars-Olof Hansson is the coach at her club Helsingborgs SS. She also has a younger brother Gustaf. She studies natural sciences at the Nationell Idrottsutbildning, a sport school in Helsingborg.

References

External links 
 
 
 

1996 births
Living people
Sportspeople from Helsingborg
Swedish female backstroke swimmers
Swedish female medley swimmers
Swedish female freestyle swimmers
Swedish female butterfly swimmers
European Aquatics Championships medalists in swimming
Medalists at the FINA World Swimming Championships (25 m)
Helsingborgs SS swimmers
World Aquatics Championships medalists in swimming
Swimmers at the 2016 Summer Olympics
Swimmers at the 2020 Summer Olympics
Olympic swimmers of Sweden
USC Trojans women's swimmers
21st-century Swedish women